Peter of Savoy may refer to:

 Peter I of Savoy (died 1078), who ruled jointly with his brother Amedeo from 1060 to 1078
 Peter II of Savoy (1203–1268), Count of Savoy
 Peter of Aigueblanche (died 1268), medieval bishop of Hereford
 Peter of Savoy (Archbishop of Lyon) (died 1332)